Diodora singaporensis is a species of sea snail, a marine gastropod mollusk in the family Fissurellidae, the keyhole limpets.

Description

Distribution

References

 Christiaens, J. 1980. The limpets of Hong Kong with descriptions of seven new species and subspecies. pp. 61–84 in B. Morton (ed.), Proceedings of the First International Workshop on the Malacofauna of Hong Kong and Southern China. page(s): 63
 Sheppard, A (1984). The molluscan fauna of Chagos (Indian Ocean) and an analysis of its broad distribution patterns. Coral Reefs 3: 43-50.
 Australian Faunal Directory

External links

Fissurellidae
Gastropods described in 1850